The 2011–12 Washington Huskies men's basketball team represented the University of Washington in the 2011–12 college basketball season.  This was head coach Lorenzo Romar's 10th season at Washington. The Huskies played their home games at Alaska Airlines Arena at Hec Edmundson Pavilion as members of the Pac-12 Conference. They finished with 24–11 overall, 14–4 in Pac-12 play. They were the 2012 Pac-12 Conference regular season champions, but lost in the quarterfinals of the Pac-12 Basketball tournament to Oregon State. They were invited to the 2012 National Invitation Tournament where they defeated Texas–Arlington, Northwestern and rival Oregon before losing in the semifinals to Minnesota.

Departures

Recruits
Source:

2011–12 Team

Roster
Source

Coaching staff

2011–12 Schedule and results

|-
!colspan=9| Exhibition

|-
!colspan=9| Regular Season

|-
!colspan=9|2012 Pac-12 men's basketball tournament

|-
!colspan=9|2012 NIT

Notes
 March 5, 2012 – Guard Tony Wroten  was named Pac-12 Freshman of the Year; Lorenzo Romar is the Pac-12 Coach of the Year.

References

Washington
Washington Huskies men's basketball seasons
Washington
Washington
Washington